Season three of Odin v odin! premiered on February 8, 2015.

Celebrities

Imitations chart

  Highest scoring performance
  Lowest scoring performance
  Qualified for the final
  Didn't qualify for the final

 On 29 April Batyrkhan Shukenov died after having a heart attack. Until his death the season had finished twelve of its fifteen episodes. The recordings of the last episodes continued but without Shukenov. Before he died he was on the third position in the ranking. The broadcast of 17 May, which was recorded before Shukenov's death, was won by Shukenov and he was named finalist there. The episode which was broadcast before that episode, on 10 May, didn't feature Shukenov because the recordings of this episode were planned on the 30th of April, one day after Shukenov's death. In the end of semi-final episode Shukenov was named the one of two winners of the season posthumously. During the final episode all (including former) participants, judges and presenters paid a tribute to him.
 Although the official rules only allow five finalists; Alexander Rybak was named as sixth finalist during the semi-final, after Maxim Galkin stated that the judges wanted him to be in the final. At the end of the show Rybak finished as runner up.

The following chart contains the names of the iconic singers that the celebrities imitated every week.

Top 3 Best results

 Highest scoring performance
 Lowest scoring performance

Notes

References

One to One!
2015 Russian television seasons